Ramanbhai Patel (1925 – date of death unknown) was a Kenyan first-class cricketer.

One of Kenya's top batsman throughout the 1950s and 1960s, Patel made his debut in first-class cricket for an International XI against an East Pakistan Governor's XI on the East Pakistan leg of their 1961–62 world tour at Dhaka. He made a further two appearances in first-class cricket, appearing for an East African Invitation XI against a touring Marylebone Cricket Club side at Kampala in 1963, followed by an appearance for the Coast Cricket Association against a touring Pakistan International Airlines team in 1964. In three first-class matches, Patel scored 29 runs with a highest score of 14.

References

External links

1925 births
Date of death unknown
Kenyan people of Indian descent
Kenyan cricketers
East African cricketers
Coast Cricket Association XI cricketers